Rial is a German producer of light alloy wheels and rims, and was a Formula One constructor competing in the  and  seasons. Founded in the 1970s as a wheel rim producer, the company was bought by Günter Schmid, ex-owner of the ATS wheels company in 1987. Schmid followed the same strategy as he had at ATS, advertising the Rial wheel brand by entering Formula One as a constructor. Rial participated in 32 Grands Prix, entering a total of 48 cars. They scored six championship points, finishing a highest of ninth in the constructors championship in 1988. After leaving Formula One at the end of the 1989 season, the Rial Racing division was closed, and the company did not race again. Rial continues to manufacture wheels and rims from its factory in Fußgönheim.

Racing history 

Günter Schmid, ex-owner of the ATS company that competed in Formula One for eight years, bought Rial in 1987, ahead of the reduction in power of the turbo-engines in 1988, and set up a Formula One team at Rial's base in Fußgönheim. With old-ATS designer Gustav Brunner, Schmid produced the Rial ARC1, powered by a Cosworth DFZ engine, an updated model of the ubiquitous design of the pre-turbo seasons. The ARC1, nicknamed the "Blue Ferrari" due to the similarities with the Brunner-designed Ferrari F1/87, featured a double wishbone pullrod suspension, with shock absorbers innovatively placed horizontally against the chassis. Andrea de Cesaris, with Marlboro sponsorship was hired to drive the car, which proved strong in testing due to a small fuel tank.

At Rial's début race, the 1988 Brazilian Grand Prix, de Cesaris qualified 14th and reached sixth place in the race, but he ran out of fuel seven laps from the end. Mechanical failures occurred during the following races, and Rial twice breached regulations; for working on the car on-track and the drivers head being above the roll bar - necessitating a modification of the car. The fuel tank was again a problem in Canada where de Cesaris ran out of fuel in fifth place; however the next race in Detroit saw Rial finish in fourth place, scoring three points. Continuous mechanical problems and the fuel tank contributed to a six-race string of retirements, de Cesaris finishing the season classified 8th in Australia. The team finished in ninth place in the constructors championship, and Andrea de Cesaris was placed fifteenth in the drivers championship.

Rial expanded to two cars ahead of the 1989 season, and with de Cesaris moving to Dallara, German drivers Christian Danner and Volker Weidler were hired to drive the ARC2. Designed by new engineer Stefan Fober, the car was an updated version of the ARC1, with reworked aerodynamics by McLaren designer Bob Bell, and the improved Cosworth DFR engine being worked into the chassis. With turbo-charged engines banned for 1989, the entry list had increased to 39 cars from 20 teams; to accommodate the number of cars a pre-qualifying system was introduced, where the new cars and the teams ranked lowest in the previous season would compete for the 30 spaces available in qualifying, and then for the 26 starters in the race. Danner did not have to pre-qualify, while Weidler driving the new entry had to enter the session.

Danner achieved a 14th place at the opening Brazilian round, before the improving cars of Rial's competitors forced Danner out of qualifying for the next two races, hampered by the older ARC2 chassis. At the Hungarian race, where an illegal rear wing saw Weidler's qualifying times deleted, both Fober and Weidler left the team following the blame by Schmid for the imposed fine. Pierre-Henri Raphanel was his replacement, bringing with him new designer Christian van der Pleyn. Gregor Foitek was brought in for Spain, but a rear wing breakage during qualifying caused an accident destroying his car, and he immediately left the team. Bertrand Gachot took over for the final two races, but neither Raphanel nor Gachot managed to qualify to race, with the outdated car several seconds off the nearest competitors in qualifying. Finishing 13th in the championship, Rial Racing closed down at the end of the year.

Complete Formula One World Championship results
(key) (results in bold indicate pole position; results in italics indicate fastest lap)

References

External links
RIAL website

Formula One constructors
Formula One entrants
German auto racing teams
German racecar constructors